Jiří Strach (born 29 September 1973) is a Czech film director and actor. He directed the film Operace Silver A in 2007. In 2016, Strach directed Angel of the Lord 2, a sequel to Angel of the Lord (2005).

References

Czech film directors
Czech male film actors
Czech male television actors
1973 births
Living people
Male actors from Prague